Indomptable was an ironclad barbette ship built for the French Navy in the late 1870s and early 1880s. They were built as part of a fleet plan started in 1872, which by the late 1870s had been directed against a strengthening Italian fleet. The ships were intended for coastal operations, and as such had a shallow draft and a low freeboard, which greatly hampered their seakeeping and thus reduced their ability to be usefully employed after entering service. The main armament consisted of two  guns, one fore and one aft, mounted in barbettes—the largest gun ever mounted on a French capital ship. Indomptable was laid down in 1878 and was completed in 1887.

Due to their handling problems, Indomptable and her sister ships saw little active service with the French fleet, instead spending most of their careers in the Reserve Squadron of the Mediterranean Fleet. During this period, the ship spent most of the year out of service with reduced crews, only being reactivated for the fleet maneuvers each year. She was modernized in 1898 with new guns, but by the early 1900s, numerous, more effective pre-dreadnought battleships had been built. These ships displaced Indomptable and her sisters in the Reserve Squadron, and she was reduced to a guard ship in Toulon in 1902. She was used as a hulk at the Arsenal de Rochefort until 1927, when she was broken up.

Design

The Terrible class of barbette ships was designed in the late 1870s as part of a naval construction program that began under the post-Franco-Prussian War fleet plan of 1872. In addition, the oldest generation of French ironclads, built in the early-to-mid 1860s, were in poor condition and necessitated replacement. The Terrible class was intended to replace old monitors that had been built for coastal defense. The Terribles were based on the s, but were reduced in size to allow them to operate in shallower waters.

After entering service, the Terrible-class ships were found to have very poor seakeeping as a result of their shallow draft and insufficient freeboard, even in the relatively sheltered waters of the Mediterranean Sea. The Navy had little use for the ships, and through the 1880s and 1890s, a series of French naval ministers sought to find a role for the vessels, along with another ten coastal-defense type ironclads built during that period. The ships frequently alternated between the Mediterranean Squadron and the Northern Squadron, the latter stationed in the English Channel, but neither location suited their poor handling.

Characteristics

The vessel displaced  and had a relatively low freeboard. Her superstructure was minimal and consisted of a small conning tower. She was fitted with a pair of tripod masts equipped with spotting tops for her main battery guns. The ship's crew consisted of 373 officers and enlisted men.

Her propulsion machinery consisted of two compound steam engines that drove a pair of screw propellers. Steam was provided by twelve coal-burning fire-tube boilers that were vented through a pair of funnels that were placed side by side, just aft of the conning tower.

Her main armament consisted of two  22-caliber M1875 guns, one forward and one aft, mounted on the centerline in barbettes. They were the largest-bore guns ever carried by a French capital ship. These were supported by a secondary battery of four  26.2-cal. M1881 guns carried in individual pivot mounts with gun shields. For defense against torpedo boats, she carried two  M1885 quick-firing guns and sixteen  Hotchkiss revolver cannon, all in individual mounts. Her armament was rounded out with four  torpedo tubes in the hull above the waterline, two tubes per side.

At even normal loading, the belt was nearly submerged entirely, reducing its effectiveness significantly. They were fitted with  hoods to protect the gun crews from shell fragments.

Modifications 
Indomptable was modernized several times during her career, primarily in attempts to correct deficiencies in her design that stemmed from excessive weights. She was found to be some  overweight, which hampered her seakeeping and reduced stability. The first refit took place at Toulon in early 1897, and involved lowering the funnel casings and removing the mainmast in an attempt to reduce weights high in the ship to improve her stability. She also had twelve new boilers installed.

In 1898, Indomptable returned to the shipyard in Toulon to be rearmed and further lightened. Her heavy 420 mm guns replaced with 40-caliber,  Modèle 1893/1896 guns that were mounted in fully enclosed, balanced turrets. Her secondary battery was replaced with a quick-firing version of the 100 mm gun, with an additional pair being installed. The light battery was also revised to ten 47 mm guns and four 37 mm autocannon. Two of her torpedo tubes were also removed. She also had the bottom strake of the aft-most section of 500 mm belt armor removed to lighten the stern. Work on the ship lasted until 1902. As a result of these changes, her crew was reduced to 332 officers and men.

Service history

The keel for Indomptable was laid down in Lorient on 5 December 1877. Her completed hull was launched on 18 September 1883, after which fitting-out work was carried out, which included the installation of her propulsion machinery between 3 June 1884 and 20 February 1885. She was commissioned for sea trials on 10 November 1885, though she was not fully manned for her initial testing until 15 June 1886. She moved from Lorient to Brest on 22 June, where she conducted her official trials from July to September. She then departed on 23 October for Toulon on France's Mediterranean coast, arriving there on 31 October. She participated in the fleet's training exercises later that year, during which she was damaged by a gale, forcing her to anchor off Hyères to shelter from the storm. Indomptable was placed in the 1st category of reserve on 20 January 1887 and was reduced to the 2nd category the following year. 

In May 1887, Indomptable took part in exercises to practice convoy escort between France and its colonial possessions in French North Africa, where the French Army kept significant forces which would have to be transported back to Europe in the event of a major conflict. The commander of the troopship convoy decided to use bad weather to make the initial crossing, as it would prevent the torpedo boats in the interception force from putting to sea. During the passage however, Indomptable was badly swamped by water, her captain signalling the squadron commander that his ship's barbettes were flooded and she was unable to keep station; the vessel was consequently detached to stop at Hyères before re-joining the fleet at Algiers.

While operating with the Mediterranean Squadron in 1889, Indomptable was again unable to keep pace with the rest of the fleet while cruising from Toulon to Algiers—this time owing to a relatively light westerly wind—while much smaller torpedo boats had no difficulty keeping station. Indomptable was assigned to the Reserve Division—later enlarged to a full squadron—of the Mediterranean Fleet, which was based in Toulon. She served in the unit for the next five years. During this period, the ships were maintained in a state of inactivity with half or two-thirds of their normal crews, only being mobilized for the annual training maneuvers with the rest of the fleet. The reserve ships took several days to ready themselves for the exercises before they were able to join the rest of the fleet by 6 July, the maneuvers lasting another five days thereafter.

In 1894, Indomptable had been reduced to the 2nd Division, Reserve Squadron, along with Colbert. She served in the fleet maneuvers in the Mediterranean that year, which included an initial period of exercises from 1 to 10 July and then larger-scale maneuvers from 17 to 28 July. She remained in the unit the following year, by which time the Reserve Squadron included Terrible, Caïman, Richelieu, and Amiral Duperré. By 1896, she had been removed from the Reserve Squadron. The following year, she began the extensive modernization at Toulon, beginning with the installation of new boilers in early 1897. She carried out sea trials to evaluate the new boilers from 2 to 3 July.

In early 1898, Indomptable was the only member of the class in service, the other three members having been withdrawn to have her armament updated. Similar modernization of Indomptable began later that year, with new main and secondary guns installed and two torpedo tubes removed, the work being completed in 1901. After returning to service in 1902, she was stationed in Toulon as a guard ship. By 1903, all four of the Terrible-class ironclads had been removed from service, their place in the Reserve Squadron having been taken by the pre-dreadnought battleships that had been built in the 1890s. Indomptable returned to the Reserve Squadron in the Mediterranean Fleet for the annual maneuvers in 1906, along with Requin, Caïman, the ironclad , and the pre-dreadnought battleship . Later that year, she was moved to Cherbourg and placed in reserve. She was struck from the naval register on 3 August 1910 and moved to the Arsenal de Rochefort, where she was used as a mooring hulk for the several years. Indomptable was eventually broken up in 1927.

Notes

References
 
 
 
 
 
 
 
 
 
 
 
 
 
 
 
 

Terrible-class ironclads
1883 ships